Phryganistria is a genus of stick insects belonging to the subfamily Clitumninae. It was described by the Swedish entomologist Carl Stål in 1875. Members of the genus are found only in Southeast Asia. Of the new species described in 2014, Phryganistria heusii yentuensis, which is 32 cm long, is one of the longest insects known to date. Another, Phryganistria tamdaoensis was selected in 2015 by the International Institute for Species Exploration as one of the "Top 10 New Species" for new species discovered in 2014. 

In May 2016, the Chinese state media Xinhua announced that a new species informally named 'Phryganistria chinensis' was discovered in Liuzhou, Guangxi autonomous region of China. The discoverer Zhao Li, at the Insect Museum of West China, had found the specimen in 2014. It has not been formally described. In August 2017, one of the offspring attained 64 cm (25.2 inch) in length, becoming the largest insect in the world, and has been listed in the Guinness World Records as the "longest insect".

Species 
The genus includes the following:
Phryganistria bachmaensis Ta & Hoang, 2004
Phryganistria fruhstorferi Brunner von Wattenwyl, 1907
Phryganistria grandis Rehn, 1906
Phryganistria guanxiensis Chen & He, 2008
Phryganistria heusii Hennemann & Conle, 1997
Phryganistria heusii heusii Hennemann & Conle, 1997
Phryganistria heusii yentuensis J. Bresseel & J Constant, 2014
Phryganistria longzhouensis Chen & He, 2008
Phryganistria tamdaoensis J. Bresseel & J Constant, 2014
Phryganistria virgea (Westwood, 1848) - synonym P. sarmentosa Westwood, 1848

See also

References

External links

Phasmatodea genera
Phasmatodea of Indo-China
Taxa named by Carl Stål